The National Federation for Just Communities is a coalition of social justice member organizations across the United States which work to overcome racism, bias, and discrimination.
The coalition of was formed in 2006 after the dissolution of the National Conference for Community and Justice.
Members meet annually at a conference hosted by one of NFJC's affiliate offices.

See also
Miami Coalition of Christians and Jews
Virginia Center for Inclusive Communities

References

External links
 

Community organizations
Non-profit organizations based in the United States
Organizations established in 2006
Social justice organizations